Saint-Jérôme (2021 population 80,213) is a suburban city located about  northwest of Montreal on the Rivière du Nord. It is part of the North Shore sector of Greater Montreal. It is a gateway to the Laurentian Mountains and its resorts via the Autoroute des Laurentides.

The town is named after Saint Jerome (ca. 347 – September 30, 420), a church father best known as the translator of the Bible from Greek and Hebrew into Latin. His translation is known as the Vulgate.

History

The territory where the present city of Saint-Jérôme now stands was granted in 1752 by the marquis de la Jonquière, governor of New France, as the seignory of Augmentation des Mille-Iles (literally "enlargement" of the seignory of Mille-Iles). From the 1760s to the 1840s, the seignory was owned by the Dumont and Lefebvre de Bellefeuille families, living in the town of Saint-Eustache,  to the south. The Dumont and the Lefebvre conceded the farmland to colonists coming mostly from the region lying north of Montreal. The emerging town was then known under the name of Dumontville. The Catholic parish of Saint-Jérôme was constituted on November 15, 1834, and the village was constituted on July 1, 1845, by governor Metcalfe.

François-Xavier-Antoine Labelle, a Roman Catholic priest who was the great "colonizer" (promoter of settlement) of the North of Montreal, was in charge of the pastoral administration of Saint-Jérôme in 1868 until his death, in 1891.  Eight years after his arrival, he had a railway built linking Saint-Jérôme and Montreal.

Antoine Labelle was the parish priest of Saint-Jérôme for 22 years, from 1868 until his death, at 57 years of age, on January 4, 1891.  He was called "the king of North, the apostle of colonization".

The opening of roads and the arrival of a railway became essential with the development of the small communities in the Laurentians. These transportation routes for the movement of goods and people would ensure the establishment of trade and industry.

Labelle promoted the idea of a railway towards the North beginning in 1869. The railway reached Saint-Jérôme in 1876, partly because a railway was seen as a way to meet the needs for firewood and construction materials for urban centres like Montreal and Quebec.

In 2002, Saint-Jérôme was amalgamated with the municipalities of Bellefeuille (2006 census population 15,866), Saint-Antoine (2001 population 11,488) and Lafontaine (2001 population 9,477).

Saint-Jérôme is the seat of the judicial district of Terrebonne.

Transportation

Road 
Saint-Jérôme is served by Québec Autoroute 15, which is part of the Trans-Canada Highway system, and Québec Route 117. In addition, Québec Routes 158 and 333 pass through the city.

Public transportation

Train 
Saint-Jérôme is served by the Saint-Jérôme intermodal commuter rail station by Exo, the Greater Montreal Region's public transit system's exo2 line. Commuter trains to Montreal began to serve the station in January 2007, with four trains in each direction each business day.

Since upgrades to the line were made in 2013, which included work to double the track between Sainte-Rose station and Saint-Martin Junction and install Automatic Train Control (ATC) between Parc station and the end of the line in Saint-Jérôme, all trains now serve the station. There are 13 departures towards Montreal during the week, and six departures on the weekends and holidays.

Bus 
The station is also served by bus routes operated by Exo, the neighbouring transit agency CRT Lanaudière, as well as three private intercity bus companies.

Trails 
Saint-Jérôme is an important stop on the north-south trunk of the "route verte" cycling path which makes it possible for nature lovers who are also pedaling enthusiasts to make short trips or excursions lasting several days from as far south as Blainville on the outskirts of Montreal and as far north as Mont-Tremblant without ever sharing the road with a motorized vehicle.  North of Saint-Jérôme, the trail is known as the "P'tit Train du Nord" linear park (rail trail) and is also used as a cross-country ski trail in winter.

Industry

Uniroyal, Dominion Rubber
In 1911, the first rubber industry in St-Jerome, shoe production
In 1926, the industry is renamed Dominion Rubber.
In the 1950s, 37,000 shoes were produced for all over the world.
In 1966, the company is renamed UNIROYAL LTD.
In 1968, the company changed its production for automobile parts, crashpad.
In 1981, the company was sold to many cities like Woodbridge and Waterville.
In 1994 the building was demolished.

Health

Institutional health care 
The Centre de santé et de services sociaux de Saint-Jérôme (Health and Social Services Centre of Saint-Jérôme or CSSS) is the non-profit body that operates three different types of a health care institution in the city: an acute-care hospital (the Hôpital régional de Saint-Jérôme), the CLSC and long-term care facilities.
By its regional vocation, it serves the entire Laurentides region. The history of the CSSS of Saint-Jerome begins with the construction of the hospital in 1949 and its opening the following year.

The main purpose of the establishment is to offer care and high-quality services to the population. In April 2007, the CSSS obtained accreditation from Accreditation Canada. This distinction confirms adequate standards of care and patient safety.

Education
Saint-Jérôme is home to the Cégep de Saint-Jérôme, one of the Colleges of General and Vocational Education located in the province. It is also home to a new Saint-Jérôme branch campus of the Université du Québec en Outaouais.

The Commission scolaire de la Rivière-du-Nord operates French-language public schools. Secondary schools in the community operated by this school district include:
 École secondaire Cap-Jeunesse
 École secondaire des Hauts-Sommets
 École secondaire des-Studios
 École polyvalente Saint-Jérôme
 École secondaire Frenette
 École secondaire Saint-Stanislas 

Sir Wilfrid Laurier School Board operates English-language public schools. Schools serving the town:
 Laurentian Elementary School in Saint-Jérôme
 Laurentian Regional High School in Lachute

Attractions

Roman Catholic cathedral, which includes a small museum
 Vieux-Palais modern art museum and public library
 Musée d'art contemporain des Laurentides
 Statue of Antoine Labelle, known as curé Labelle, who was principally responsible for the settlement of the Laurentians
 Several summer festivals
Carrefour du Nord, a regional shopping mall
Melançon Arena, an indoor arena

Demographics 

Saint-Jérôme is mostly made up of European descents. As of the 2021 census the racial make up of Saint-Jérôme is:
 91.8% White
 1.8% Indigenous; 1.0% First Nations, 0.6% Métis
 1.3% Latin American
 3.2% Black
 0.1% South Asian
 0.2% East Asian; 0.2% Chinese, 0.0% Korean, 0.0% Japanese
 1.0% Arab
 0.3% Southeast Asian; 0.1% Filipino 
 0.1% West Asian
 0.1% Multiracial; 0.7% including Métis
 0.1% Other

In 2021, 66.1% of the population was Christian, down from 88.1% in 2011. 59% were Catholic, 4.5% were Christian n.o.s and 0.6% were Protestant. All other Christian denominations and Christian-related traditions made up 2.0% of the population. 31.3% of residents were non-religious or secular, up from 11.1% in 2011. All other religions and spiritual traditions accounted for 2.6% of residents. The largest non-Christian religion was Islam at 1.9%.

Population trend:
 Population in 2021: 80,213 (2016 to 2021 population change: 7.9%)
 Population in 2016: 74,346 
 Population in 2011: 68,456 
 Population in 2006: 63,729
 Population in 2001: 59,614
 Saint-Jérôme: 24,583
 Bellefeuille: 14,066
 Saint-Antoine: 11,488
 Lafontaine: 9,477
 Population in 1996:
 Saint-Jérôme: 23,916
 Bellefeuille: 12,803
 Saint-Antoine: 10,806
 Lafontaine: 9,008
 Population in 1991:
 Saint-Jérôme: 23,384
 Bellefeuille: 10,883
 Saint-Antoine: 10,232
 Lafontaine: 7,365

The 2021 census found that 92.3% of residents spoke French as their mother tongue.

The next most common languages were English (1.6%) and Spanish (1.4%).

Notable people
 Tod Campeau, Professional hockey player
 Jonathan Huberdeau, Professional hockey player
 Boule Noire, singer
 Marc Nadon, Supreme Court nominee
 Little Beaver, wrestler

Twin towns
 Lisieux, France - since May 2010?

See also
 Municipal reorganization in Quebec
 Quebec Gatineau Railway

References

Bibliography 
 Auclair, Elie-J.,  Saint-Jérôme de Terrebonne , Imprimerie J.H.A. Labelle, 1934, pages 13–35.

External links

Ville de Saint-Jérôme, in French

 
Cities and towns in Quebec